Evangeleen Ikelap (born 18 January 1982) is an athlete who competed internationally for the Federated States of Micronesia.

She represented Federated States of Micronesia at the 2004 Summer Olympics in Athens, she competed in the 100 metres where she finished 7th in her heat in a time of 13.50 seconds thus failing to advance to the next round.
Her younger sister Maria Ikelap competed in the same event at the 2008 Summer Olympics.

References

External links
 

1982 births
Living people
Federated States of Micronesia female sprinters
Olympic track and field athletes of the Federated States of Micronesia
Athletes (track and field) at the 2004 Summer Olympics
Olympic female sprinters